There have been numerous proposals for the creation or incorporation of new states of Australia, since the late 19th century. These proposals have involved: giving existing territories the official status of states; negotiating the inclusion of other independent  countries (or one of their overseas territories), and; forming new states from parts of existing states. However, no new states have been added since the federation of six former British self-governing colonies in 1901, as states of the new Commonwealth of Australia.

Unofficial proposals have involved current territories, especially the Northern Territory (NT) and, to a lesser extent, the Australian Capital Territory (ACT). Other, long-standing proposals have included negotiating the addition of: New Zealand (as either one or two states), Papua New Guinea, Fiji or East Timor. More recently, there have been proposals for an  Aboriginal state, possibly modelled on the Inuit territory of Nunavut in Canada.

Procedure
Section 124 of the Constitution of Australia provides for the establishment or admission of new States to the Federation. It may also increase, diminish, or otherwise alter the limits of a State, form a new state by separating territory from an existing State, or join multiple States or parts of States, but in each case, it must have the approval of the Parliament(s) of the State(s) in question.

In relation to parliamentary representation, the Joint Select Committee on Electoral Reform in 1985 recommended that territories be entitled to:
 Separate representation from the ACT or NT once they have more than half a quota of population (for a House of Representatives seat);
 A floor of two senators for the ACT and NT each; and
 One extra senator for every two lower house members.
 That new states should not have representation any more favourable than Territories as prescribed in the Commonwealth Electoral Act 1918.

Historical proposals

Immediately before federation in 1901, the Australian mainland comprised six separate British self-governing colonies. Throughout the 19th century, the borders of these colonies changed often, there were numerous proposals for new colonies and, in some instances, new colonies were gazetted, but later dissolved and incorporated (or reincorporated) into other colonies.

In 1838, the Journal of the Royal Geographical Society published "Considerations on the Political Geography and Geographical Nomenclature of Australia" (1838), in which a major reorganisation of the colonial borders was proposed. The following new colonies were proposed:

 "Dampieria", in north-west Australia;
 "Victoria" (not to be confused with the modern Victoria), in South West Western Australia;
 "Tasmania", (not to be confused with the modern Tasmania) in western Arnhem Land and part of the later Kimberley;
 "Nuytsland", covering most of the Nullarbor Plain (except for its western edges);
 "Carpentaria", on the shores of the Gulf of Carpentaria;
 "Flindersland", covering most of the area of the future South Australia; 
 "Torresia" in what would become northern Queensland (including far north Queensland);
 "Cooksland" centred on Brisbane, and including northern New South Wales, and;
 "Guelphia" – central and southern New South Wales (which at the time included all of the future Victoria).
(Van Diemen's Land, later known as Tasmania, was to be preserved in its then current form.)
These proposed colonies were geometric divisions of the continent, and did not take into account soil fertility, aridity or population. This meant that central and western Australia were divided into several states, despite their low populations both then and now. 

For several months in 1846, a Colony of North Australia technically existed, with its capital at Gladstone. The short-lived colony officially included most of the future Queensland (except Brisbane and surrounding areas) and the future Northern Territory. Between the time it was gazetted, in February 1846 and the time it was officially cancelled, that December, the area of the new colony continued to be controlled by the government of New South Wales; at no point did a separate colonial administration of North Australia take control of it.

There was also a proposal in 1857 for the "Seven United Provinces of Eastern Australia" with separate provinces of Flinders Land, Leicharts (sic) Land (taken from the name of Ludwig Leichhardt) and Cooks Land in modern day Queensland (also named from James Cook).

Auralia

Proposed in the late 19th and early 20th centuries, the state of Auralia (meaning "land of gold") would have comprised the Western Australian Goldfields, the western portion of the Nullarbor Plain and the port town of Esperance. Its capital would have been Kalgoorlie.

However, the population in the modern region of Goldfields-Esperance is currently lower than that of the Northern Territory, and there is little evidence of recent support, although the idea of a state centred around Kalgoorlie was proposed in 2003.

East Timor
During the process of Portuguese decolonisation in East Timor in 1974, a political party was formed called ADITLA Associação Democrática para a Integração de Timor Leste na Austrália (Democratic Association for the Integration of East Timor into Australia) by local businessman Henrique Pereira. It found some support from the ethnic Chinese community, fearful of independence or integration with Indonesia but was disbanded when the Australian government rejected the idea in 1975.

Illawarra Province
Also known as the Illawarra Territory, this proposed new state would consist of the Illawarra region centred on Wollongong on the New South Wales south coast. Originally this idea arose after disagreements between local landowners and migrants from Sydney in the mid-19th century. However the idea has continued in various incarnations ever since with most movements proposing the state's capital be situated in "Illawarra City", or the amalgamation of the Shellharbour and Kiama local government areas.

North Coast
This proposed state would take in the northern part of New South Wales from Taree to the Queensland Border, mainly in the north east, and excluding most of north west NSW.

Papua New Guinea

Papua New Guinea is physically closest of any country to geographically remote Australia, with some of the Torres Strait Islands just off the main island of the country. Its Southern part became an Australian colony in 1902, while its Northern part was seized by Australia from Germany in 1914 and administered as a "C" Mandate of the League of Nations from 1920. Both territories were amalgamated after Second World War into a single Australian colony. In 1953, the editor of the conservative Quadrant magazine, Professor James McAuley, wrote that the territory would be "a coconut republic which would do little good for itself", and advocated its "perpetual union" with Australia, with "equal citizenship rights", but this was rejected by the Australian government. Papua New Guinea was granted self-government and full independence in 1975.

Princeland

This proposed colony resulted from a movement in the 1860s to create a new colony that incorporated the isolated western Victoria and south-eastern South Australia regions centred on Mount Gambier and Portland. A petition was presented to Queen Victoria, but was rejected.

South Coast
There was a small movement in the 1940s to create a new state in south-east New South Wales and north-east Victoria. The proposed state would have reached from Batemans Bay on the coast to Kiandra in the Snowy Mountains, and as far south as Sale in Victoria. The proposed state capital was Bega. Despite calls from local advocacy groups for a Royal Commission into the idea, it was met with little success.

Current proposals
Since 2000, proposals for reorganisation have continued to be put forward. For instance, in 2003, Bryan Pape suggested a reorganisation into about twenty states, each with Senate representation.

Republicanism, changing mineral wealth and tax distribution have been seen as reasons to revisit federation. Proposals include redivision between the local, state and federal levels of government, either consolidation or fragmentation. It has been argued that new technologies in service delivery are enablers of greater decentralisation or are a reason for greater efficiency in centralisation.

Aboriginal state
There are also supporters of an Aboriginal state, along the lines of Nunavut in Canada. The Aboriginal Provisional Government was established in 1990 for the purpose; Paul Coe sued the Commonwealth for Aboriginal sovereignty (Coe v Commonwealth [1979] HCA 68) and see Kevin Gilbert 'Treaty 88'. All advocated for an Aboriginal state. Agence France Presse (21 August 1998) claims Australia blocked a United Nations resolution calling for the self-determination of peoples, because it would have bolstered support for an Aboriginal state within Australia. Among those supporting such a state are the Council for Aboriginal Reconciliation.

Australian Capital Territory

Supporters of the Australian Capital Territory (ACT) becoming a state believe the ACT, with a population only 20% lower than that of Tasmania, is underrepresented in the Australian Parliament.

Despite this, the movement is small and no prominent political figures have given it support as of 2022; further to this, the wording of s.125 of the Australian Constitution implies that the ACT must remain a territory owned by the Commonwealth and cannot become a state.

New England

New England is a region of New South Wales and a proposed state.

New Zealand
There have been several proposals for New Zealand to become the seventh state of Australia. One proposal, suggested humorously by the Liberal Senator Ian Macdonald, is that New Zealand's North Island and South Island could become the seventh and eighth states of the Commonwealth. New Zealand was one of the colonies asked to join in the creation of the Commonwealth of Australia, even by the time the Commonwealth of Australia Constitution Act 1900 (Imp) was enacted, that law still provided for New Zealand to be one of the potential states of Australia. As ties have grown closer, people have made proposals for a customs union, currency union and even a joint defence force. New Zealand and Australia enjoy close economic and political relations, mainly by way of the Trans-Tasman Travel Arrangement, Closer Economic Relations (CER) free trade agreement signed in 1983 and the Closer Defence Relations agreement signed in 1990. In 1989, former Prime Minister of New Zealand Sir Geoffrey Palmer said that New Zealand had "gained most of the advantages of being a state of Australia without becoming one". The two countries, along with the USA, are in ANZUS, but New Zealand's opposition to nuclear weapons has weakened this treaty.

History

In 1788, Arthur Phillip assumed the position of Governor of New South Wales, claiming New Zealand as part of New South Wales. In 1835, a group of Māori chiefs signed the Declaration of Independence, which established New Zealand as a sovereign nation. A few years later, the Treaty of Waitangi re-established British control of New Zealand. The Federal Council of Australasia was formed with members representing New Zealand, Victoria, Tasmania, South Australia and Fiji. Although it held no official power it was a step into the establishment of the Commonwealth of Australia.

In 1890, there was an informal meeting of members from the Australasian colonies, this was followed by the first National Australasian convention a year later. The New Zealand representatives stated it would be unlikely to join a federation with Australia at its foundation, but it would be interested in doing so at a later date. New Zealand's position was taken into account when the Constitution of Australia was written up. Australia, in an attempt to sway New Zealand to join, gave Māori the right to vote in 1902, while Australian Aboriginal people did not fully gain the right to vote at national elections until 1962. In 1908 and 1912, Australia and New Zealand sent Australasians teams to the Olympic Games. New Zealand and Australian soldiers fought together in 1915 under the name ANZAC.

Australian academic Bob Catley wrote a book titled Waltzing with Matilda: should New Zealand join Australia?, a book arguing that New Zealand should become one with Australia, which was described by New Zealand political commentator Colin James as "a book for Australians". In December 2006, an Australian Federal Parliamentary Committee recommended that Australia and New Zealand pursue a full union, or at least adopt a common ANZ currency and more common markets. The Committee found that "while Australia and New Zealand are of course two sovereign nations, it seems... that the strong ties between the two countries – the economic, cultural, migration, defence, governmental and people-to-people linkages – suggest that an even closer relationship, including the possibility of union, is both desirable and realistic." This was despite the Australian Treasurer Peter Costello and New Zealand Minister of Finance Michael Cullen saying that a common currency was "not on the agenda".

A 2010 UMR research poll asked 1000 people in Australia and New Zealand a series of questions relating to New Zealand's becoming the seventh state of Australia. One quarter of the people thought it was something to look into. Over 40% thought the idea was worth debating. More Australians than New Zealanders would support such a move.

Advantages
A leading factor for the proposal of New Zealand as a state of Australia is the major economic benefits it could bring. However, free trade and open borders now appear to be the maximum extent of public acceptance of the proposal. There are many family connections between the two nations, with around 500,000 New Zealanders living in Australia and 60,000 Australians living in New Zealand as of 2013. Peter Slipper, a former Member of Australia's Parliament, once said, "It's about how can we improve the quality of living for people on both sides of the Tasman" when referring to the proposal.

Disadvantages
Concerns have been expressed about the need for a common currency, about changes to the South Pacific Nuclear Free Zone Treaty, and about the retention of the administrative and political recognition of the ancestral rights of the indigenous Maori population under the Treaty of Waitangi.

A number of disparities that could lead to conflict including the current constitutions (written in Australia, unwritten in New Zealand), the status of political rights (constitutionally entrenched in Australia but not in New Zealand). Some New Zealanders feel they have established a national identity, one which they feel they may lose if they became part of Australia. Others argue New Zealand is too far away from the mainland of Australia.

North Queensland

One proposal is that Queensland should be divided by the 22nd parallel with the boundary running just south of Sarina on the coast to the Northern Territory border between Boulia and Mount Isa, and the capital would be Sellheim, near Charters Towers, to overcome rivalry between Mackay, Townsville and Cairns. The name Capricornia has been proposed for this state.

According to The Courier-Mail in 2010, the majority of North Queensland Mayors were in favour of the separation from Queensland proper. Only two of the hundred delegates at the NQ Local Government Association meeting were against the proposal – the two being Mayor Val Schier (Cairns) and Mayor Ben Callcott (Charters Towers).

Northern Territory

The Northern Territory (NT) is the most commonly mentioned potential seventh state.

In a 1998 referendum, the voters of the Northern Territory narrowly rejected a statehood proposal that would have given the territory three senators, rather than the twelve held by the other states, although the name "Northern Territory" would have been retained.

With statehood being rejected, it is likely that the Northern Territory will remain a territory for the near future, though former Chief Minister Clare Martin and the majority of Territorians are said to be in favour of statehood.

While statehood would under normal circumstances give the Northern Territory 12 senators, the same number of senators as every other state, its population as of 2021 is only 3% of the largest state, New South Wales. This means that whilst one NSW senator represents 682,000 people, one NT senator would represent approximately 21,000 people. By comparison, one Tasmanian senator represents 45,000 people, while one South Australian senator (next smallest state by population) represents 148,000 people. If the NT were only given 3 senators as proposed in the 1998 referendum, each would represent around 63,000 people (along with a higher quota for election)

An alternative name for the new state would be North Australia, which would be shared by two historic regions. The matter was raised again in July 2015, with a further referendum in 2018 being mooted.

Riverina
Riverina is also a proposed state, in the Murray River region, on the border between New South Wales and Victoria. The Division of Riverina is currently a smaller area than traditional Riverina, which would include the Division of Farrer. Along with the ACT, it is one of the few landlocked proposed states.

In December 2020, there was a proposal by Northern Victoria MP Tim Quilty to form a new state from Northeastern Victoria and Southeastern New South Wales, because people in regional areas feel like they are neglected by their state governments. There was also a proposal to form three new states. They are: A new state comprising Greater Geelong and Metropolitan Melbourne; Regional Northeastern Victoria and Southeastern New South Wales combing, and Greater Sydney to become separate states.

Some supporters also propose a "River-Eden" state in the south of NSW and the north of Victoria, which, rather than being landlocked, would stretch eastwards to the coastal town of Eden.

See also

 51st state
 Australia–New Zealand relations
 Australia–Papua New Guinea relations
 Australian regional rivalries
 List of regions in Australia
 New Australia
 Pacific Union
 Proposed provinces and territories of Canada
 Secessionism in Western Australia

References

External links
 Why New Zealand did not become an Australian State
 The Australian Empire

Government of Australia

Australia–Papua New Guinea relations
Australia–Fiji relations
Australia–New Zealand relations
National unifications
States, proposed
Proposals in Australia
Lists of proposals